The Sixth Day: Single Collection is a compilation album released by Gackt on February 25, 2004. The album collects the artist's previous single's title songs, some of them having been re-recorded for this release. The Sixth Day complements The Seventh Night, an unplugged album released three months later.

Release
The album was released on February 25, 2004, by Nippon Crown. In the second counting week of March it reached number three on the Oricon chart, with sales of 106,412 copies. In the upcoming two weeks, it was at number eight and ten respectively, with sales of 32,174 and 15,227 copies. It charted for 23 weeks, Gackt's album record, and with sales of 196,458 copies, was the 78th best-selling album of the year, certified Platinum by RIAJ.

Track listing

References

Gackt compilation albums
2004 compilation albums